Touché Mon Amour is the second studio album by a Korean jazz band, Winterplay, released on September 4, 2010, in Korean. The album contains thirteen songs by Winterplay. The vocalist on all tracks is Haewon Moon.

Music videos

Track listing

References

External links
 Official Website

2010 albums
Winterplay albums